Silvano Pietra is a comune (municipality) in the Province of Pavia in the Italian region Lombardy, located about 50 km southwest of Milan and about 25 km southwest of Pavia. As of 31 December 2004, it had a population of 723 and an area of 13.8 km².

Silvano Pietra borders the following municipalities: Bastida de' Dossi, Casei Gerola, Corana, Mezzana Bigli, Sannazzaro de' Burgondi, Voghera.

It was the site of a royal property at least from the reign of Lambert (896), who granted it to his mother, Ageltrude. It was bequeathed by Queen Adelaide to the monastery of the Saviour at Pavia in 999, but it was still probably regarded as owing service to the crown as late as the 12th century, when it is probably one of the "great appurtenances" of Corana mentioned in the Tafelgüterverzeichnis.

Demographic evolution

References

Cities and towns in Lombardy